The Lambretta V-Special is a scooter produced by Innocenti S.A. under the brand name Lambretta. The bike has been introduced in 3 models the V50 Special, V125 Special and the V200 Special. The V-Special began production in 2017 and is based on the SYM Fiddle.

Design 
The Lambretta V-Special was designed by KISKA (designers of KTM and Husqvarna Motorcycles) and the frame and engine are from an SYM Fiddle III. The engine displacements for the V50, V125 and V200 are 49.5cc, 124.7cc and 168.9cc respectively, and they are single cylinder 2-valve air-cooled four-strokes. The power is delivered through a continuously variable transmission (CVT) and uses a centrifugal clutch and is belt driven for the final drive. The body styling was an attempt to keep as much classic Lambretta looks in the bike as possible but some sacrifices had to be made due to the 'donor' bikes engine, chassis and suspension, such as the sloping foot boards and side panels and the height of the front mudguard. The front mudguard comes in two styles, 'Fixed' and 'Flex'. The side panels are double layered with a 1.2mm steel beam running to the sides which are the covered with side panels. It has Lambretta badges on the front light, rear and casing while the horn cover has an Innocenti badge.

Colours 
The colour schemes available are Matt Grey or Orange for the V50 fixed Mudguard and Red, Blue, White and Black in flex mudguard. The V125 comes in Matt Grey or Orange in fixed mudguard and Red, Blue, White, Black and Brown in flex mudguard. The V200 with a fixed mudguard come in Orange and Silver Blue while with a flex mudguard it comes in Blue, White, Black and Brown. The seat colours depend on the colour chosen for the bike with Dunkelbraun coming with Matt Grey paint, Black coming with Orange, Red and Brown. The Dark brown seat comes with Silver Blue, Blue and Black paint jobs.

Pirelli Edition 
The V125 Special Pirelli Edition is made in association with Pirelli the colour scheme is Matt Grey-Black lacquer finish with red Pirelli accents and is only available with 124.7cc engine displacement and a 'fixed fender' front mudguard. The Special collaboration edition is limited to 999 units worldwide.

References

External links 

Motor scooters
Innocenti vehicles
Motorcycles introduced in 2017